Human Rights Watch Film Festival is an annual film festival held by Human Rights Watch organization in more than 20 countries which previews human rights films and videos in commercial and archival theaters and on public and cable television. This film festival was established in 1988, in part to mark the 10th anniversary of the founding of Human Rights Watch. After 3 years, it was resumed in 1991 and has since been presented annually.

Editions of the festival are currently held in Amsterdam, Geneva, London, Los Angeles, Miami, New York City, San Diego, Oslo, Toronto and the San Francisco Bay Area.

See also 
 International Film Festival and Forum on Human Rights

References 

Human Rights Watch
Film festivals established in 1989
Film festivals held in multiple countries
Film festivals in the Netherlands
Film festivals in Switzerland
Film festivals in London
Film festivals in Los Angeles
Film festivals in Florida
Film festivals in New York City
Film festivals in San Diego
Film festivals in Toronto
Film festivals in Norway
Film festivals in the San Francisco Bay Area